Bembidion is the largest genus of beetles in the family Carabidae by number of species. All species are small (less than 7.5 mm) and move very fast. Most of them live close to water. The genus has a biantitropical distribution, meaning they are found in both the Northern and Southern Hemispheres, but not in the tropics. In warmer regions it is substituted by closely related Tachys and other genera.

Taxonomy

There have been many attempts to divide it into smaller genera, most notably by René Jeannel in 1941 and by G.G. Perrault in 1981, but none of them have been generally accepted.

This genus is divided into numerus subgenera, some of which are elevated to full genus rank by various authors; as noted above, however, no universally accepted way of splitting the genus exists yet. Bembidion subgenera include:

 Actedium Motschulsky, 1864
 Ananotaphus Netolitzky, 1931
 Andrewesa Netolitzky, 1931
 Antiperyphanes Jeannel, 1962
 Antiperyphus Jeannel, 1962
 Aptenidium Habu & Ueno, 1955
 Apteromimus Wollaston, 1877
 Armatocillenus Dupuis, 1912
 Asioperyphus Vysoky, 1986
 Aureoplataphus Netolitzky, 1943
 Australoemphanes Toledano, 2005
 Bembidion Latreille, 1802
 Bembidionetolitzkya E.Strand, 1929
 Bembidromus Toledano, 2000
 Blepharoplataphus Netolitzky, 1920
 Bracteon Bedel, 1879
 Chilioperyphus Jeannel, 1962
 Chinocillenus Netolitzky, 1942
 Chlorodium Motschulsky, 1864
 Cillenus Samouelle, 1819
 Cyclolopha Casey, 1918
 Desarmatocillenus Netolitzky, 1939
 Diplocampa Bedel, 1896
 Ecuadion Moret & Toledano, 2002
 Emphanes Motschulsky, 1850
 Endosomatium Wollaston, 1877
 Euperyphus Jeannel, 1941
 Eupetedromus Netolitzky, 1911
 Furcacampa Netolitzky, 1931
 Gnatholymnaeum Sharp, 1903
 Gondwanabembidion Toledano, 2005
 Hirmoplataphus Lindroth, 1963
 Hoquedela Müller-Motzfeld, 1988
 Hydriomicrus Casey, 1918
 Hydrium LeConte, 1847
 Hypsipezum Alluaud, 1917
 Jammuphanes J.Schmidt & Marggi, 2014
 Jedlickion Toledano, 2008
 Josefia Toledano, 2000
 Leuchydrium Casey, 1918
 Limnaeoperyphus Nakane, 1963
 Lindrochthus Maddison, 2012
 Liocosmius Casey, 1918
 Lymnaeum Stephens, 1828
 Melomalus Casey, 1918
 Metallina Motschulsky, 1850
 Microserrullula Netolitzky, 1921
 Microsinocys Toledano, 1998
 Necpericompsus Netolitzky, 1935
 Neja Motschulsky, 1864
 Neobembidion Bousquet, 2006
 Neoemphanes Habu, 1978
 Nepha Motschulsky, 1864
 Nesocidium Sharp, 1903
 Nipponobembidion Habu & Baba, 1968
 Notaphemphanes Netolitzky, 1920
 Notaphocampa Netolitzky, 1914
 Notaphus Dejean, 1821
 Nothocys Jeannel, 1962
 Notholopha Jeannel, 1962
 Nothonepha Jeannel, 1962
 Notoperyphus Bonniard de Saludo, 1970
 Ochthedromus LeConte, 1847
 Ocydromus Clairville, 1806
 Ocyturanes Müller-Motzfeld, 1986
 Odontium LeConte, 1847
 Omoperyphus Netolitzky, 1931
 Omotaphus Netolitzky, 1914
 Pacmophena Jeannel, 1962
 Pamirium Netolitzky, 1920
 Paraprincidium Netolitzky, 1914
 Pekinium Csiki, 1901
 Peryphanes Jeannel, 1941
 Peryphidium Tschitscherine, 1895
 Peryphiolus Jeannel, 1941
 Peryphodes Casey, 1918
 Peryphophila Netolitzky, 1939
 Peryphus Dejean, 1821
 Philochthemphanes Netolitzky, 1943
 Philochthus Stephens, 1828
 Phyla Motschulsky, 1844
 Plataphus Motschulsky, 1864
 Plocamoperyphus Jeannel, 1962
 Politophanes Müller-Motzfeld, 1998
 Princidium Motschulsky, 1864
 Pseudometallina Netolitzky, 1920
 Pseudoperyphus Hatch, 1950
 Pseudophilochthus Wollaston, 1877
 Pseudosinocys Toledano, 2005
 Pseudotrepanes Jeannel, 1962
 Sakagutia Ueno, 1954
 Semicampa Netolitzky, 1910
 Sloanephila Netolitzky, 1931
 Taiwanobembidion Habu, 1973
 Talanes Motschulsky, 1864
 Terminophanes Müller-Motzfeld, 1998
 Testediolum Ganglbauer, 1891
 Testedium Motschulsky, 1864
 Thaumatoperyphus Netolitzky, 1935
 Trechonepha Casey, 1918
 Trepanedoris Netolitzky, 1918
 Trepanes Motschulsky, 1864
 Trichoplataphus Netolitzky, 1914
 Zeactedium Netolitzky, 1931
 Zecillenus Lindroth, 1980
 Zemetallina Lindroth, 1976
 Zeperyphodes Lindroth, 1976
 Zeperyphus Lindroth, 1976
 Zeplataphus Lindroth, 1976
 † Archaeophilochthus Ortuño & Arillo, 2010
 † Eodontium J.Schmidt & Michalik, 2017

References and notes

External links

 Tree of Life A list of species